"Daisies" is a song by American singer Katy Perry. It was released on May 15, 2020, by Capitol Records as the lead single from her sixth studio album, Smile (2020). The song was serviced to US adult contemporary and pop radio formats on May 18 and June 9, 2020, respectively. She co-wrote the track with Jon Bellion, Jacob Kasher Hindlin, Michael Pollack, and its producers Jordan K. Johnson and Stefan Johnson of the Monsters & Strangerz. "Daisies" reached number four in Scotland and the top 20 in Croatia and Hungary as well as number 27 in Ireland.

Release
On May 7, 2020, Perry announced through social media that her upcoming sixth album's first single, entitled "Daisies", would be released on May 15, 2020. Its cover art was also posted that day, featuring Perry smiling in a field of yellow daisies. The following day, in a promotional campaign for "Daisies", coinciding with Mother's Day, a digital flower shop called "Katy's Daisies" which offers 12 free multicolored bouquet options to "tell someone you care, you love them, you miss them, or simply thank them for believing in you" was opened. A remix from MK followed on May 29, 2020.

Composition
"Daisies" is a pop and electropop song with acoustic guitars that runs for 2 minutes and 53 seconds. The track "celebrates the strength of the human spirit as it overcomes adversity". Perry said it took on a new meaning of revitalizing lost dreams discovered through the challenges of quarantine during the COVID-19 pandemic. During a Facebook live stream, the singer shared details about the song, saying, "It's a song for all of the dreams that you guys have been dreaming about, and all the things you want to achieve". When "Daisies" premiered, she also revealed on social media that the song was written "a couple of months ago as a call to remain true to the course you've set for yourself, regardless of what others may think". Its lyrics include "They told me I was out there / tried to knock me down / took those sticks and stones / showed 'em I can build a house / They told me I was crazy / But I'll never let 'em change me / 'til they cover me in daisies."

Critical reception

Alexa Camp of Slant Magazine described "Daisies" as an "atmospheric ballad". Brittany Spanos of Rolling Stone described the song as a "booming, empowering [...] bright track". The New York Posts Chuck Arnold said the track is "Perry's best song since her 2013 album Prism". Jem Aswad of Variety called the song a "Firework"-style slow burner that shows off how far she's come as a singer". Vulture contributor Chris Murphy also praised the song, calling it a "pretty good" acoustic-guitar-driven pop song. Jessica Castillo, editor of Teen Vogue, praised the song's themes of self-esteem and inspiration, concluding that "Daisies" is "a perfect reminder to stay your path and pay no mind to people who doubt you". Kate Solomon of The Guardian wrote that "this song is basically Unconditionally and Tsunami and every other power ballad [Perry]'s ever done".

Chart performance
"Daisies" debuted at number 40 on the US Billboard Hot 100, giving Perry her 25th top 40 song in the country. It also reached number three on the US Digital Song Sales chart. On the Adult Top 40 chart, "Daisies" became Perry's 16th top-ten single, charting at 9, becoming her highest charting entry on the chart since "Chained to the Rhythm" (2017). By having 16 songs reaching the top ten, Perry became the fifth artist with the most top-ten songs on the chart.

Elsewhere, the song peaked at number 37 on the UK Official Charts Company, and on number six on the UK Singles Downloads Chart. The song has reached number 33 on the Canadian Hot 100 chart. It peaked at number 4 on the Spanish Sales Chart, Perry's highest charting single since appearing on Calvin Harris's 2017 single "Feels" with Pharrell Williams and Big Sean. It reached higher peaks on other charts, including number 4 on Scotland, number 2 on the Ultratip Belgium chart, 12 in Croatia and 3 on New Zealand Hot Singles.

Promotion

Live performances

On May 15, 2020, Perry performed a stripped-down take of "Daisies" and participated in a Q&A with fans on Amazon Music's weekly Friday Live performance series. She also performed the song on Houseparty's "In the House" event on the same day.

The first televised performance of the song occurred during the eighteenth season finale of American Idol on May 17, 2020; the performance utilized mixed reality technology, using a soundstage in Los Angeles equipped with LED screens and augmented reality graphics to allow Perry to see and interact with a digital environment in real-time (rather than using chromakey). On May 22, 2020, Perry performed live on Good Morning America, kicking off Good Morning America's 2020 Concert Series. She also performed Daisies along with her 2010 hit Firework on Youtube's Dear Class of 2020 event. Perry also performed a deep house remix virtually for the Can't Cancel pride benefit concert on June 26, 2020.

Music videos
A music video, directed by Liza Voloshin, was released along with the single on May 15, 2020. It was shot during quarantine and showcases Perry in a naturalistic setting. She later revealed that the music video was not what was originally planned, but due to the COVID-19 pandemic, the initial shoot set to happen on March 13, 2020 was cancelled.

In support of LGBT Pride, Perry released an alternative video titled "Daisies (Can't Cancel Pride)" on June 26, 2020. The video uses the deep house remix of "Daisies" by Oliver Heldens and is a recording of Perry performing the song virtually at the Can't Cancel Pride benefit concert. This remix also interpolates lines from her back catalogue of songs including: "I Kissed a Girl", "Peacock", "Walking on Air" and "Swish Swish".

Awards and nominations

Track listing

Digital download and streaming
"Daisies" – 2:53

Digital download and streaming (MK remix)
"Daisies" (MK remix) – 3:34

Digital download and streaming (Oliver Heldens remix)
"Daisies" (Oliver Heldens remix) – 3:35

Digital download and streaming (acoustic)
"Daisies" (acoustic) – 3:05

7-inch vinyl
Side A – "Daisies" – 2:53
Side B – "Daisies" (instrumental) – 2:53

Credits and personnel
Credits adapted from Tidal.

Katy Perry – lead vocals, songwriter
Chris Anokute – A&R
Jonathon Bellion – songwriter, associated performer, background vocals
Rachel Findlen – engineer
Lauren Glucksman – A&R
John Hanes – mixing engineer
Jacob Kasher Hindlin – songwriter
Jordan K. Johnson – songwriter
Stefan Johnson – songwriter
Dave Kutch – mastering engineer
Michael Pollack – songwriter, associated performer, guitar
Pierre-Luc Rioux – associated performer, guitar
Gian Stone – vocal producer
The Monsters & Strangerz – producers, associated performers, vocal engineers, vocal producers

Charts

Weekly charts

Year-end charts

Certifications

Release history

References

External links
 

2020s ballads
2020 singles
2020 songs
Capitol Records singles
Electropop ballads
Katy Perry songs
Songs written by Katy Perry
Songs written by Jacob Kasher
Songs written by Jon Bellion
Song recordings produced by the Monsters & Strangerz
Songs written by Stefan Johnson
Songs written by Jordan Johnson (songwriter)
Songs written by Michael Pollack (musician)